The 1998–99 Iraqi Premier League was the 25th season of the competition since its foundation in 1974. The league title was won by Al-Zawraa for the eighth time in their history. Had Al-Talaba beaten Al-Naft on the last day of the season, they would have won the league title instead, but the match finished goalless and Al-Zawraa's 3–1 win over Al-Karkh saw them claim the trophy. Al-Zawraa also won the Iraq FA Cup to complete the double.

League table

Results

Season statistics

Top scorers

Hat-tricks

Notes
4 Player scored 4 goals
5 Player scored 5 goals

References

External links
 Iraq Football Association

Iraqi Premier League seasons
1998–99 in Iraqi football
Iraq